"An Everlasting Love" is a song written by Barry Gibb, performed by Andy Gibb, released in June 1978 as the second single from his second studio album Shadow Dancing. The song peaked at #5 on the Hot 100 on 23 September 1978 and #10 in the UK.  "An Everlasting Love" was Gibb's only Top 10 hit in the United Kingdom.

"An Everlasting Love" became a Gold record.  It was his fourth of five hits to do so.  Its B-side "Flowing Rivers" was the title song of his first album (1977).

Information
"An Everlasting Love" was written by Barry Gibb for Andy, who also produced it along with Albhy Galuten and Karl Richardson.  Barry Gibb arranged the orchestra and provided falsetto vocals on the chorus.

Andy Gibb's headstone reads Andy Gibb / March 5, 1958 - March 10, 1988 / "An Everlasting Love".

Reception
Cash Box said it has an "arrangement of soft, hazy vocals, rhythm guitar touches and string backing" and that "the non-stop flow of the lyric is particularly appealing."  Record World said that the song has "much the feeling of 'Shadow Dancing.'"

Track listing
"An Everlasting Love" (Barry Gibb) - 4:06
"Flowing Rivers" (Andy Gibb) - 3:37
UK
"An Everlasting Love" - 4:06
"I Just Want to Be Your Everything" - 3:45
"(Love Is) Thicker Than Water" - 4:15
France
"An Everlasting Love" - 4:06
"(Love Is) Thicker Than Water" - 4:15

Chart performance

Weekly charts

Year-end charts

Certifications
RIAA: Gold

References

External links
 

1978 singles
Songs written by Barry Gibb
Andy Gibb songs
Song recordings produced by Barry Gibb
RSO Records singles
Disco songs
1978 songs
Song recordings produced by Albhy Galuten